Time in Korea may refer to:

Time in North Korea
Time in South Korea